Jos massacre may refer to:

2001 Jos riots
2008 Jos riots
2010 Jos riots
2010 Jos bombings
2014 Jos bombings
5 July 2015 Nigeria attacks